Clark Advanced Learning Center is a public charter high school in Stuart, Florida in the Martin County School District that partners with Indian River State College. The school enrolled 250 students in a 2021 census. Its mascot is the crane and its main color is green.  The executive director is Debra Kohuth.

Clark Advanced Learning Center has been ranked as the third highest rated Florida high school on the Newsweek 2016 American’s Top High Schools ratings, receiving a 110 out of 500 in the national ranking based on college readiness, graduation rate and college bound students.

References

External links
 

High schools in Martin County, Florida
Martin County School District
Charter high schools in Florida
Stuart, Florida
2004 establishments in Florida
Educational institutions established in 2004